is a Japanese politician of the Liberal Democratic Party (LDP), a member of the House of Representatives in the Diet (national legislature). A native of Kamakura, Kanagawa and graduate of Keio University, he worked at the national newspaper Mainichi Shimbun from 1995 to 2001. In 2005 he was elected to the House of Representatives for the first time, after running unsuccessfully in 2003.

References

External links 
  in Japanese.

1972 births
Living people
People from Kamakura
Politicians from Kanagawa Prefecture
Keio University alumni
Koizumi Children
Members of the House of Representatives (Japan)
Liberal Democratic Party (Japan) politicians